"" (Christ rose to Heaven) is a German Ascension hymn. The church song is based the medieval melody of the Easter hymn "". It was an ecumenical song from the beginning, with the first stanza published in 1480, then included in a Lutheran hymnal in 1545, and expanded by the Catholic Johannes Leisentritt in 1567. It appears in modern German Catholic and Protestant hymnals, and has inspired musical settings by composers from the 16th to the 21st century.

History 
Most 15th century church hymns were sung in Latin. A few chants on high holidays sung in German became the first to introduce vernacular language into the liturgy. They began as inserts into tropes in Latin sequences. "" is a Leise, an early church song in German, each verse ending with the word "Kyrieleis" (from the Greek "kyrie eleison", for "Lord have mercy". It is modeled after the Easter Leise "". The hymn, one stanza and Alleluia, appeared first in Crailsheim in 1480, in a Schulordnung, where it was inserted in the Latin "Summi triumphum Regis". The 1545 hymnal Babstsches Gesangbuch had the same text, but with a slightly different melody. The second stanza appeared first in Bautzen in 1567, in Johannes Leisentritt's collection Geistliche Lieder und Psalmen [...] (Spiritual songs and psalms).

The hymn was part of the 1938 hymnal Kirchenlied, a Catholic hymnal published by Georg Thurmair containing also Protestant songs. It has been printed in German Protestant hymnals up to Evangelisches Gesangbuch (EG 120). It is also part of the German Catholic hymnal Gotteslob, as GL 319, written below the music for "" as GL 318).

The contemporary theologian  wrote a paraphrase titled "Der ersetzte Himmel" ("The replaced Heaven"), beginning each of five stanzas with the first line of the traditional hymn, then reflecting aspects of its meaning.

Text 
The text (with additional line-break after each comma) is:

The text is in modern German:

Musical settings 
Johannes Werlin composed a setting for three voices in 1648. Hugo Distler wrote a setting as part of his cycle Der Jahrkreis, Op. 5, for three high voices a cappella, replacing Kyrieleis by Halleluja.  wrote a three-part setting in 1962. Dominik Gerhard composed an organ improvisation on the song in 2009. Christopher Tambling wrote a setting for three or four voices and brass on his own melody, published in 2015. Hermann Pallhuber composed an orchestral piece "Momentum Profectionis" which is based on the hymn and was premiered in Crailsheim in 2016, for the 500th anniversary of the Reformation.

References

External links 
 Christ fuhr gen Himmel (Hugo Distler) ChoralWiki
 
 Auflistung von Reformationsliedern im EG / als Vorschlag einer sonntäglichen Predigtreihe 201 kk-rm.de
 Johann Paul Zehetbauer: Christ fuhr gen Himmel
 Ekaterina Porizko: Andacht zum Monatslied Mai 2017 / Christ fuhr gen Himmel (EG 120)  Protestant Church Stuttgart 2017

1480 works
German Christian hymns
15th-century hymns
Easter hymns
Ascension of Jesus